Australops is a genus of trilobites in the order Phacopida, which existed in what is now Argentina. It was described by Baldis in 1972, and the type species is Australops australis.

References

External links
 Australops at the Paleobiology Database

Fossils of Argentina
Calmoniidae
Phacopida genera